Chris Lawn is a former Gaelic footballer who played for the Tyrone county team. He was on the substitutes bench for the entirety of the 2003 final, and came on as a substitute in the 2005 final, for the injured Joe McMahon. He has All-Ireland medals from 2003 and 2005. He was nominated for an All-Star award in 1995, but did not win. He also, until this day, has been a long serving stalwart of the Moortown team, including a brief stint as manager.

After championship success in 2005, he, along with Peter Canavan, announced his retirement from inter-county football.

Until recently he managed the Cookstown Fr. Rock's club side and led them to promotion and an intermediate all-ireland club championship in 2009.

References

1972 births
Living people
Gaelic football managers
Tyrone inter-county Gaelic footballers
Winners of two All-Ireland medals (Gaelic football)